Donna Summer is the self-titled tenth studio album by American singer-songwriter Donna Summer, released on July 19, 1982. It featured the Top 10, Grammy-nominated "Love Is in Control (Finger on the Trigger)" single and State of Independence. On its 40th anniversary in 2022, Donna Summer's estate announced a re-issue of the album with one unreleased track, which was originally a B-side on the lead single, "Love Is In Control (Finger on the Trigger). Certain songs were quite challenging for Summer to record, as she was pregnant with her daughter Amanda Grace at the time. 

On the US Billboard Hot 100, "Love is in Control (Finger on the Trigger)" peaked at number 10. Second single, "State of Independence" missed the top 40 and the third and final single The Woman In Me managed to peak at number 33. 

The album reached the Top 20 of the US Billboard 200, therefore showing a considerable commercial decline for Summer, as her previous album "The Wanderer", which peaked at number 13. However, her next album "She Works Hard For The Money" would become her last ever top ten album to date.

Background
Having left Casablanca Records, with whom she had had some of the biggest selling and most popular hits of the disco era in the 1970s, Summer had signed to Geffen Records in 1980 and had continued working with Giorgio Moroder and Pete Bellotte, with whom she had written the vast majority of her hits. However, label owner David Geffen had been disappointed with the chart performance of the 1980 The Wanderer, Summer's debut album for Geffen and rather than release the follow-up I'm a Rainbow, which Summer had recorded with Moroder/Bellotte in 1981, Geffen had Summer record a new album with Quincy Jones from whom a production credit – given Jones' track record particularly his work with Michael Jackson – Geffen felt would guarantee a commercial smash. The resultant Donna Summer album was the first time the singer had worked with a producer other than Moroder and Bellotte since 1974 save for the one-off track "Down Deep Inside (Theme from "The Deep")" which was produced by John Barry for the film The Deep, and the "No More Tears (Enough is Enough)" duet with Barbra Streisand which was co-produced by Gary Klein of The Entertainment Company.

Writing and recording
Since the disco era, Summer's work had covered a variety of musical genres and this album was no exception. It had quite a strong soul influence, and featured a couple of gospel-styled tracks, namely "(If It) Hurts Just a Little" and a version of Jon and Vangelis' "State of Independence", which featured an all-star choir. Rock music was also found in the form of the Bruce Springsteen-penned "Protection"; the track had been planned as a Donna Summer/Bruce Springsteen duet but that concept was abandoned as unworkable. The album concluded with Summer's take on the Billy Strayhorn torch standard "Lush Life". The song "Mystery of Love" used the opening material from Bach's "The Well-Tempered Clavier", Book 1: Prelude and Fugue No. 2 in C minor for the keyboard part in the introduction and verse.

Several very popular songwriters were used on this album. As well as the aforementioned Springsteen, Vangelis and Jon Anderson, Quincy Jones himself contributed to the writing, as did other names such as Rod Temperton, Merria Ross, John Lang, Richard Page, Bill Meyers, Michael Clark, John Bettis, David Foster, Steve Lukather, Michael Sembello, Dan Sembello and David Batteau. This made it the largest number of songwriters ever to contribute to a Donna Summer album.

A period of six months elapsed between the first session for the Donna Summer album and the completion of the tracks. Summer has since stated that this was one of the hardest albums ever to record – some of the songs were quite challenging, plus she was pregnant with her daughter Amanda Grace at the time. It has also been reported that she found producer Quincy Jones to be rather boisterous and controlling and soon after the album's release she opened up to the Los Angeles Times: "Sometimes I feel it's a Quincy Jones album that I sang on".

Release
The Donna Summer album was released July 19, 1982 with the advance single: "Love Is in Control (Finger on the Trigger)" having been issued six weeks previous. "Love Is in Control" would peak at No. 10 on the Billboard Hot 100 in September 1982 when the Donna Summer album would reach No. 20 in Billboard; the album's subsequent single releases: "State of Independence" and "The Woman in Me", which respectively peaked on the Hot 100 at Nos. 41 and 33, failed to increase the album's chart impact.

Ultimately the Donna Summer album would fall short of its goal to restore its singer to the level of stardom she'd enjoyed in the 1970s: "Love Is in Control" would have the lowest Hot 100 peak of a lead single from an album of new material by Donna Summer since 1977 and the No. 20 peak of the Donna Summer album evidenced a further drop in popularity from the singer's debut album of the 1980s: The Wanderer, whose No. 13 peak had disappointed David Geffen to the point where he'd suppressed the follow-up album Summer had prepared with Giorgio Moroder and Pete Bellotte instigating the Quincy Jones-produced Donna Summer album project (see I'm a Rainbow).

"Love Is in Control" did represent a considerable comeback for Summer on the R&B charts with a No. 4 peak affording the singer her fifth Top 5 R&B hit. Summer also reached the UK Top 20 with both "Love Is in Control" and "State of Independence" with these tracks both reaching the Top Ten in the Netherlands – at respectively Nos. 6 and 1 – where "The Woman in Me" reached No. 7.

The aforementioned advance single "Love Is in Control" featured a non-album track on its B-side: "Sometimes Like Butterflies", a song that Summer penned with Bruce Roberts. This song would later be covered by Dusty Springfield, and Summer's original version was included on the CD, A Different Love by Canadian singer, Mark Tara, as a benefit for CANFAR (Canadians For AIDS Research). Quincy Jones is credited as producer for this song as well, although the minimalistic approach to this song was very different from the tracks included on the Donna Summer album.

French electronic duo Cassius sampled "(If It) Hurts Just a Little" on their 1999 single "Cassius 99 Remix".

On April 23rd, 2022 “Donna Summer” was re-released as a 40th anniversary picture disc as a Record Store Day exclusive. Only 3500 copies were released.

Track listing

Personnel 
 Donna Summer – lead vocals, backing vocals (1, 7)
 Michael Boddicker – Polymoog (1), vocoder (1), synthesizer programming (2, 4, 5, 7, 9), drum programming (4), vocoder programming (5)
 Greg Phillinganes – Yamaha Portasound (1), synthesizers (1, 4-7), Synclavier II (2), synth bass (2, 9)
 David Paich – acoustic piano (2), synthesizers (2, 4, 6, 7, 8), keyboards (3)
 Steve Porcaro – synthesizer programming (2, 4-7), drum programming (3, 5, 8), synthesizers (8)
 Don Dorsey – Synclavier II programming (2), Synclavier II (4), synthesizer programming (4, 9)
 David Foster – synthesizers (5, 8)
 Roy Bittan – acoustic piano (6)
 Dave Grusin – synthesizers (9), Fender Rhodes (9)
 Michael Sembello – guitars (1, 2, 5, 7), backing vocals (7)
 Steve Lukather – guitars (3, 5, 6, 8)
 Bruce Springsteen – guitars (6)
 Louis Johnson – bass guitar (2, 4, 6)
 Leon "Ndugu" Chancler – drums (1, 2, 4, 7, 9)
 Larry Bunker – drums (5)
 Harvey Mason – drums (5)
 Joe Porcaro – drums (5)
 John Robinson – drums (5)
 Jeff Porcaro – drums (6)
 Paulinho da Costa – percussion (1, 2, 4, 7)
 Rini Kramer – percussion (5)
 Ernie Watts – tenor saxophone (1, 4, 9), horns (1, 2, 5, 7), alto saxophone (6), baritone saxophone (6)
 Bill Reichenbach Jr. – horns (1, 2, 5, 7)
 Gary Grant – horns (1, 2, 5, 7)
 Jerry Hey – horns (1, 2, 5, 7)
 Howard Hewett – backing vocals (1, 5)
 James Ingram – backing vocals (1-5, 7)
 Phillip Ingram – backing vocals (1, 5)
 Bill Champlin – backing vocals (2, 3, 4)
 Steve George – backing vocals (2, 3, 4)
 Richard Page – backing vocals (2, 3, 4)
 Cruz Baca Sembello – backing vocals (7)
 Pamela Quinlan - backing vocals (2, 3, 4, 7)
 Liza Miller – backing vocals (7)

All-Star Choir on "State of Independence"
 Dara Lynn Bernard, Dyan Cannon, Christopher Cross, James Ingram, Michael Jackson, Peggy Lipton Jones, Quincy Jones, Kenny Loggins, Michael McDonald, Lionel Richie, Brenda Russell, Donna Summer, Dionne Warwick and Stevie Wonder

Choir on "Livin' In America"
 Dara Lynn Bernard, Patrick Crotty Jr., Deirdre Dantzler Ribeiro, Michael Davis, Tonya DeWalt, Debra Green, James Ingram, Kidada Jones, Rashida Jones, Shanté Lewis, Heather Mason, Greg Phillinganes, Dina Rich, Cynthia Spears, Deirdre Spears, Bernard Walton, Lynn T. Walton and Faith D. Wong – singers
 H. B. Barnum – director
 Billie Barnum – supervisor
 Dennis Cosby – conductor
 Guy Spells – conductor

Arrangements
 Quincy Jones – rhythm arrangements (1, 2, 4, 5, 7, 9), vocal arrangements (1, 4, 5, 7), synthesizer arrangements (2, 4, 5, 7)
 Rod Temperton – rhythm arrangements (1, 4, 5, 7), vocal arrangements (1, 4), synthesizer arrangements (5, 7)
 James Ingram – rhythm arrangements (1), vocal arrangements (1)
 Jerry Hey – horn arrangements (1, 2, 5, 7)
 Bill Meyers – rhythm arrangements (2), synthesizer arrangements (2)
 Greg Phillinganes – rhythm arrangements (2), synthesizer arrangements (2)
 David Paich – rhythm arrangements (2, 4), synthesizer arrangements (2, 3), arrangements (8)
 Michael Omartian – string arrangements (2)
 Richard Page – vocal arrangements (3)
 Greg Mathieson – synthesizer arrangements (4)
 Harvey Mason – arrangements (5)
 David Foster– rhythm arrangements (5), synthesizer arrangements (5), arrangements (8)
 Michael Sembello – rhythm arrangements (7), synthesizer arrangements (7), vocal arrangements (7)
 Johnny Mandel  – string arrangements (9)
 Dave Grusin – rhythm arrangements (9), synthesizer arrangements (9)

Production 
 Quincy Jones – producer 
 Bruce Swedien – engineer, mixing
 Steve Crimmel – assistant engineer
 Matt Forger – assistant engineer, technical director
 John Van Nest– assistant engineer
 Bernie Grundman –  mastering 
 Jeff Lancaster – art direction, design
 Chris Whorf – art direction, design
 David Alexander – photography
 Susan Muano Management Co., Inc. – management

Charts

Weekly charts

Year-end charts

Single

Sales and certifications

References

 
 

1982 albums
Donna Summer albums
Albums produced by Quincy Jones
Geffen Records albums
Albums arranged by Quincy Jones
Albums arranged by Johnny Mandel
Funk albums by American artists